Last of the Pony Riders is a 1953 American Western film directed by George Archainbaud and starring Gene Autry in his last starring feature film and Kathleen Case.

Plot

Cast
 Gene Autry as Gene Autry 
 Champion as Champ
 Kathleen Case as Katie McEwen
 Dickie Jones as Johnny Blair
 John Downey as Tom McEwen
 Howard Wright as Banker Clyde Vesey
 Arthur Space as Jess Hogan
 Gregg Barton as Dutch Murdoch
 Smiley Burnette as Smiley

References

Bibliography
 Dick, Bernard F. The Merchant Prince of Poverty Row: Harry Cohn of Columbia Pictures. University Press of Kentucky.

External links
 

1953 films
1953 Western (genre) films
American Western (genre) films
Films directed by George Archainbaud
Columbia Pictures films
American black-and-white films
1950s English-language films
1950s American films